The Ghana women's national football team represents Ghana in international women's football. It is governed by the Ghana Football Association. Its players are known as the Black Queens.

History

The beginning
The Ghana women's national team played its first international match on 16 February 1991 against Nigeria in Lagos, Nigeria. The match ended in a 5 in a match that ended 5–1 win for Nigeria.

Team image

Nicknames
The Ghana women's national football team has been known or nicknamed as the "Black Queens."

Kits and crest
The black queens have always won similar kits as their male counterparts over the years. With these kits there is a black star which is adopted from Flag of Ghana and national coat of arms in the centre of the national crest. 

The kits were sponsored by Puma SE from 2005, with the deal ending in 2014. The white kit is used instead of the original gold, green, and red coloured football kit based on the colours of the Ghana national flag. The Black Stars have used an all-white and partly black football kit which was worn from the years 1957 to 1989 and again from 2006 until December 2014.

Between 1990 and 2006 the Ghana national three team used the kit in the colours of the national flag of Ghana, with gold, green and red used extensively, as in the team's crest and also known as the Pan-African colours.  The Ghana national football team's football kit for the 2014 FIFA World Cup was ranked as the best kit of the tournament by BuzzFeed. A yellow and black patterned kit was introduced in 2020 by Puma. The jersey received positive reviews on social media especially Twitter. The white kit was maintained but a black and white Kente patterned introduced.

Kit suppliers

Home stadium

Grounds and training grounds

There is an unknown home stadium for the Black Queens. World Cup and Africa Cup of Nations qualifying matches have been played at the Essipong Stadium in Sekondi-Takoradi, Kumasi Sports Stadium in Kumasi, the Cape Coast Sports Stadium in Cape Coast, the Accra Sports Stadium in the Accra and the Tamale Stadium in Tamale.

The Black Queen's training facilities and training grounds are Ghanaman Soccer Centre of Excellence also known as the National camp site or the GFA Technical Centre (GSCE) located in Prampram.

Rivalries

Nigeria
Just like their male counterparts the ''Black Stars'' Ghana national football team the Black Queens have a fierce rivalry with the Super Falcons, the Nigeria women's national football team dating to when they played their first international match till present day, with their matches creating a buzz in the media anytime the two meet.

Overall official record

Results and fixtures

The following is a list of match results in the last 12 months, as well as any future matches that have been scheduled.

Legend

2022

2023

Fixtures and Results – Soccerway.com

Coaching staff

Current coaching staff

Manager history

Anthony Edusei (1993)
Jones Ofosuhene (1997)
Emmanuel Kwasi Afranie (1998–1999)
 P.S.K. Paha (2000–2002)
 Oko Aryee (2002–)
 John Eshun (2005)
 Bashir Hayford (2005–2006, no competitive games)
 Isaac Paha 2006–2008)
 Mumuni Gamel (2008–2009)
 Anthony  Edusei (2009–2011)
 Kuuku Dadzie (2011–2012)
 Yusif Basigi (2013–2017)
 Didi Dramani (2017–2018)

 Mercy Tagoe-Quarcoo (2018)
 Bashir Hayford (2018–2019)
 Mercy Tagoe-Quarcoo (2019–2023)
 Nora Häuptle (2023–)

Players

Current squad
Caps and goals as of 10 March 2020 after match against .

Recent call-ups
The following players have been called up to a Ghana  squad in the past 12 months.

Previous squads
FIFA Women's World Cup
 1999 FIFA Women's World Cup squad
 2003 FIFA Women's World Cup squad
 2007 FIFA Women's World Cup squad
Africa Women Cup of Nations
2000 African Women's Championship squad
2010 African Women's Championship squad
2014 African Women's Championship squad
2016 Africa Women Cup of Nations squad
2018 Africa Women Cup of Nations squad

Notable players
Alberta Sackey – 2002 African Women Player of the Year
Adjoa Bayor – 2003 African Women Player of the Year

Captains

Alberta Sackey (199?–2003)
Memunatu Sulemana (2003–2006)
Adjoa Bayor (2006–2010)
Florence Okoe (2010–2012)
Leticia Zikpi (2012–2014) General Captain (2018)
Elizabeth Addo (2016–)

Records

*Active players in bold, statistics correct as of 28 August 2021.

Most capped players

Top goalscorers

Honours

Continental
 Africa Women Cup of Nations
  Champions: none
  Runners-up: (1998, 2002, 2006)
  Third place: (1995**, 2000, 2004, 2016)

African Games
  Champions:  2015

Regional
 WAFU Zone B Women's Cup
  Champions: 2018
  Third place: 2019

Competitive record

FIFA Women's World Cup

Olympic Games
Summer Olympics record
1996: Africa not eligible
2000: Did not qualify
2004: Did not qualify
2008: Did not qualify
2012: Did not qualify
2016: Did not qualify

Women's Africa Cup of Nations

*Draws include knockout matches decided on penalty kicks.

African Games

WAFU Women's Cup record

See also
Sport in Ghana
Football in Ghana
Women's football in Ghana
Ghana Football Association
Ghana women's national under-20 football team
Ghana women's national under-17 football team
Ghana men's national football team
List of Ghana women's international footballers

References

External links
 Official website, GHANAFA.org
 FIFA profile

 
African women's national association football teams